Reloaded: 20 #1 Hits is the second greatest hits album by  American country singer Blake Shelton. It was released on October 23, 2015, by Warner Bros. Nashville. The album features the number one hits from Shelton's fifteen-year career.

Commercial performance
Reloaded: 20 Number 1 Hits debuted at number five on the Billboard 200, selling 32,800 copies on its first week. The following week, it sold an additional 18,000 copies. It also debuted at number two on the Top Country Albums.    The album has sold 373,100 copies in the US as of March 2017, and 3,883,000 units consumed in total including tracks and streams as of March 2020.

Track listing

Charts

Weekly charts

Year-end charts

Certifications

Release history

References

2015 greatest hits albums
Albums produced by Scott Hendricks
Blake Shelton albums
Warner Records albums
Compilation albums of number-one songs